In the Heat of the Night is an American police procedural crime drama television series loosely based on the 1967 film and 1965 novel of the same title. It starred Emmy winner  Carroll O'Connor as police chief Bill Gillespie and Emmy and Oscar-nominated actor Howard Rollins as police detective Virgil Tibbs, and was broadcast on NBC from March 6, 1988, until May 19, 1992, then on CBS from October 28, 1992, until May 16, 1995. Its executive producers were Fred Silverman, Juanita Bartlett, and O'Connor.

Premise
The show itself is a sequel to the 1967 film, set several years in the future. In the premiere episode, Philadelphia homicide detective and criminal profiler Virgil Tibbs has returned to his hometown of Sparta, Mississippi, for his mother's funeral. Under his relationship with Bill Gillespie, the white police chief fostered during a previous murder investigation in which he assisted, Tibbs is persuaded by the mayor to remain in Sparta as Chief of Detectives. The events of the first film, although 21 years in the past, are said to have occurred "a few years ago" in a type of retcon to explain the ages of the characters.

Mayor Findlay himself has an ulterior motive for hiring Tibbs: he wants to have some kind of record on civil rights to run for Congress, and hiring Tibbs to integrate the all-white Sparta police department would help to overcome the local squad's reputation of being racist and underskilled — and it also benefits him. Although the team suffers friction over Tibbs' dissatisfaction with the department's limited resources and racial attitudes, and Gillespie is annoyed at the detective's condescending suspicions about his hometown, the two men prove highly effective in enforcing the law.

At the beginning of the seventh season, Tibbs takes a leave of absence, moving to Jackson, Mississippi, to complete his law degree on a compressed schedule. Upon his return to Sparta, he and his wife Althea have separated, and they later divorce. She moves back to Philadelphia with their twins to be near her parents. Through the hard work of Sparta Councilwoman Harriet DeLong, Tibbs is able to retire and keep his city pension, although he was two months shy of the qualifying period. He begins practicing law when he accepts a position in Ben Taylor's law office. Rollins' final appearance on the series was February 2, 1994.

Meanwhile, the Sparta city council dismisses Gillespie as chief of police. The council selects Hampton Forbes (Carl Weathers) to take Gillespie's place. Forbes is the town's first African American to serve in that position. Gillespie finds a new post of equivalent authority as county sheriff. The two senior police officials find that they get along excellently, in both professional and personal spheres.

Themes
The show dealt with a variety of issues, including racism, police brutality, interracial relationships, hate crimes, drug trafficking, drug addiction, alcoholism,  AIDS, misogyny, incest, child abuse, sexual harassment, euthanasia, anti-Semitism, political corruption, prostitution, domestic violence, mental disorders, dysfunctional families, suicide, capital punishment, poverty, and drunk driving.

Season-by-season overview

First season, 1988
The first season was filmed in Hammond, Louisiana. Hammond was selected by executive producer Juanita Bartlett to represent the small southern town of Sparta, Mississippi. The producers had difficulty finding usable filming locations, because other, more modern structures were close enough to be picked up in the images. Eight episodes were filmed—the two-hour pilot movie and six regular one-hour episodes. The series premiered on March 6, 1988, with the season finale airing on May 3, 1988.

Many conflicts arose between Juanita Bartlett and series star Carroll O'Connor over the writing of the series. At first, she allowed him to consult on the series per his contract. After the pilot, however, she ordered scripts from her writers. O'Connor described these as "recycled material from other crime shows". He was disappointed in the writing, feeling that the writers were taking big-city stories and imposing them on a small town. He believed that the key to this show's success was to express its small-town locale and characters through the stories. Scripts would be given to him marked "FINAL: NO REWRITES", but O'Connor often rewrote scripts anyway. This angered the production staff members, which felt they were burning up fax machines with the changes.  O'Connor described Bartlett as a very arrogant person. If the show was going to be renewed, then O'Connor was not interested and threatened to quit the show if Bartlett was not replaced as executive producer.

The early episodes were gritty, raw and considered groundbreaking for that time. There was an emphasis on grisly murders or other crimes, rather than the lives of the New South-era characters, for which the series later became known.

Second season, 1988–89
Season 2 premiered on December 4, 1988, due to a writers' strike; the season introduced a new look and set of executive producers, Jeri Taylor and her husband David Moessinger, with on-location shooting moved from Louisiana to Covington, Georgia, which remained as the primary filming location of the show for the duration of the series. The season premiere was aired as a two-hour TV movie originally entitled "The Voodoo Murders", now known in syndication as "Don't Look Back". The plot revolved around a copycat murder of one that Gillespie had investigated 20 years earlier. Also, the Sparta city council was pushing Virgil Tibbs to run as a possible candidate for Chief of Police to replace Gillespie, but Virgil wasn't interested in doing so; regardless, a rumor begins that Tibbs is after Gillespie's job, causing dissension between the two men. Althea, who was a stay-at-home wife in Season 1, is offered a position as a teacher and guidance counselor at local Sparta High School by city Councilman Ted Marcus (Thom Gossom Jr.).

Gone was Christian LeBlanc, who portrayed Officer Junior Abernathy and added were two new regular characters—Joanne St. John (played by Lois Nettleton), the chief's sometime girlfriend and owner of the local diner, The Magnolia Cafe; and rookie officer Wilson Sweet (Geoffrey Thorne), fresh out of the police academy. The season also introduced the first of several new recurring characters, including Dr. Frank Robb, the county coroner (played by veteran actor Dan Biggers). "The Creek" saw the introduction of the first new police character and the second prominent Georgia performer to claim a regular role on the series, Officer Randy Goode (1988–1993) played by Randall Franks, who was cast following the show's move to Covington.  "Gunshot", where Virgil experiences guilt and mental trauma after he shoots and kills a female robbery suspect, introduces a character with a criminal past who later becomes invaluable in supplying Gillespie and the Sparta P.D. with information, Jimmy Dawes (Afemo Omilami).

Plots in this season included Gillespie witnessing the execution of a man whom he arrested years ago, an episode that Carroll O'Connor wrote himself under the pseudonym Matt Harris ("A Trip Upstate").

During the filming of the episode "Walkout", Carroll O'Connor began to experience fatigue. It was discovered that he needed sextuple heart bypass surgery, due to years of heavy smoking. During the last four episodes of the season, Joe Don Baker was brought in as Tom Dugan, a replacement for Chief Gillespie, who was said to be away at a police training conference at Quantico. The episodes where Gillespie was away were "Fifteen Forever", "Ladybug, Ladybug", "The Pig Woman of Sparta" and "Missing". Dugan was appointed acting chief by Councilwoman White, but he was actually working undercover for the FBI in an attempt to stop the assassination of a civil rights preacher during a visit to the town by a white supremacist group (that is not revealed until the Season 3 episode "Anniversary"). The season finale "Missing" has the chief being kidnapped upon his return to Sparta by two men in pig masks, and the police and the FBI are trying to locate him and those responsible. O'Connor wanted the chief to undergo heart surgery in the storyline, but the husband and wife producers came up with this storyline instead. It was the final straw in a long line of complaints; these producers were fired at the end of the season, with O'Connor becoming the executive producer for season three and beyond.

When Taylor and Moessinger decided to do the show, Taylor was quoted, "I was one of those in the '60's that was out marching for civil rights," and "I was one of those who thought the major work had all been done. When we decided to do the show, we took research trips to the South, and we saw that there had been an enormous amount of change. We came back with a renewed vigor but also with the realization that there is still a lot more to be done. There is still deeply entrenched racism. And addressing that became a much larger element in our thinking about the show."

"What makes race relations a constant in our show is the two lead characters—one is white and one is black," Moessinger said. "Whether they are angry at each other, whether they're happy or sad, we're showing the interaction of two men who are trying to do the best in life. If we never put one race issue into it, if we never said one word about it, the message is there because it's showing how people ought to interrelate, how they ought to work together, how they ought to get along."

Third season, 1989–90
In the third season, Carroll O'Connor took complete control of the show, after firing husband and wife executive producing team David Moessinger and Jeri Taylor. From that point on, he brought aboard writers and showrunners who shared his vision of where he wanted the series to go.

Althea Tibbs grapples with the effects and aftermath of rape in the explosive season premiere episode titled "Rape". Upon returning home from the grocery store one afternoon after school, Althea is raped in her kitchen by Sparta High School's new music teacher, Stephen Ainslee (played by guest star Ken Marshall). Althea, Ainslee's boss, had an uneasy relationship with him from the outset because he had trouble handling her authority, and it culminated in the attack. Althea and Virgil are frustrated trying to bring Ainslee to justice because new district attorney Gerard Darnelle (Wilbur Fitzgerald) doesn't have enough evidence to prosecute him, especially a positive ID (Ainslee blindfolded Althea with her scarf during the attack, so she didn't see Ainslee's face, but she recognized his voice), and Ainslee's wife Linda provides him with an alibi saying that he was at home with her at the time that Althea was attacked. After being excoriated by Gillespie for her complicity, Linda finally comes forward and implicates her husband. Ainslee invades Virgil and Althea's home during this time and attempts to attack Althea again, but Althea fights back and Ainslee is arrested.

The second part of the Season 2 finale, "Missing", is resumed in Episode 6, entitled "Anniversary" – a decision made by O'Connor that displeased the network because the episodes were not shown in chronological order. The Season 2 cliffhanger depicted Gillespie being kidnapped and Dugan murdered; with the displacement of the episodes, it was as if none of that ever happened. O'Connor selected "Rape" to kick off Season 3 instead because he thought it was more powerful and would attract higher ratings.

The character of Joanne St. John was eliminated to make room for Sparta city Councilwoman Harriet DeLong (Denise Nicholas) as Chief Gillespie's future love interest, first as a recurring character, then later, as a main cast member. An attractive divorcée, Harriet was college-educated (an Alpha Kappa Alpha member), outspoken, and brimming with attitude, which was a turn-off to Gillespie at first and the two of them did not get along.

In "First Girl", Gillespie hires Christine Rankin, Sparta's first black policewoman. She is killed her first day on duty in a shootout with a drug dealer and murder suspect, causing Gillespie despair and guilt. As a result, he is temporarily suspended from his duties as chief of police pending an investigation and intent on seeking out Rankin's killer. Her replacement was Officer LuAnn Corbin, played by Crystal R. Fox. LuAnn would remain a prominent character throughout the rest of the series, although Fox was listed in the ending credits as a guest star until season seven where she finally appeared in the opening credits. Hiring LuAnn opens the door for more policewomen to join the force; Officer Dee Shepard (Dee Shaw) is hired later in the season.

In the two-part season finale, "Citizen Trundel" (written by O'Connor, Cynthia Deming, and William J. Royce), Harriet DeLong's sister Natalie is murdered by order of her secret lover and the married father of her nine-year-old son, millionaire businessman V.J. "Vidge" Trundel. The situation causes Harriet anguish, rage, and frustration, not only because of Natalie's murder but because Chief Gillespie is reluctant to pursue the powerful Trundel as a suspect. These are the first episodes in which we see Bill and Harriet's relationship blossom. During this period, he is able to see beyond her hardened exterior and finds a vulnerable and sensitive woman behind it; she discovers his compassionate side. From this point on, a camaraderie is formed between the two.

This story arc was of special significance to series co-star Denise Nicholas, who played Harriet DeLong. Ten years earlier, her real-life sister had been murdered and the culprit had never been caught. When Carroll O'Connor approached Nicholas about the storyline, it had upset her greatly and she had to write him a note explaining the situation, as he was unaware of the circumstances. He offered to have her not appear in the episode, but she chose to do so to bring closure for her and her family. She was able to channel her unresolved grief into the role.  Only O'Connor and director Leo Penn knew the truth during filming.

Rollins' substance abuse problems
During the back half of season 3, Howard Rollins took six weeks off when he entered a drug and alcohol rehab program to battle his addiction issues. He missed five episodes: "King's Ransom", "Triangle", "Hello In There", "December Days", and "An Angry Woman". MGM worked around his rehab schedule. Episodes were not necessarily aired in the order they were filmed, which explains why Tibbs was present one week and not the next. To explain his absence, he was said to be in New Orleans working for the FBI. He considered suicide shortly before Christmas 1989, prompting his stay in rehab. Carroll O'Connor threatened to sue a tabloid which published a story saying that MGM and Carroll had fired Rollins for being absent from the set due to his problems. Denise Nicholas, who played Harriet DeLong, said "Carroll set the standard for loyalty. If he liked you, he really liked you and would be there for you."

Fourth season, 1990–91
Cynthia Deming and William J. Royce were made main story editors.

The season opens with a two-hour movie entitled "Brotherly Love" and the birth of Virgil and Althea's twins. While Althea is waiting to go into labor, Tibbs' friend and ex-colleague from the Philadelphia P.D. is found dead, and it's at first labeled as a suicide. Tibbs heads up to the big city to attend his funeral, only to learn his friend's death was not by his own hand, but murder. Tibbs soon recognizes there is corruption going on within the police department, and his friend was framed for the murder of a drug dealer. In the process of trying to clear his friend's name, he first becomes a target, then framed for murder himself. Chief Gillespie travels to Philly to get Virgil out of jail, help him solve the mystery of what happened to his friend and seek justice for him, expose the corrupt officers and make it back home to Sparta in time for the twins' birth. William and Sarah Tibbs were welcomed into the world on September 18, 1990.

Other stories include Bubba going to Los Angeles to extradite a Sparta resident responsible for a fire that killed two people, which was actually the first of two backdoor pilots for a series that featured Alan Autry, but neither were picked up by the network.

Fifth season, 1991–92
The fifth season begins with the revelation that Chief Gillespie has a 19-year-old daughter by the name of Lana Farren, played by Christine Elise (formerly of Beverly Hills, 90210). The chief is now good friends with her mother, Georgia Farren, played by actress Stella Stevens. Lana was conceived during a period where her mother was separated from her husband, and she and Gillespie had an affair. However, she was never divorced from her husband, Ken Farren.

In the episode "The More Things Change", Gillespie and Harriet share their first kiss after he drives her home after attending a party, and he finally reveals his affections for her. They both lament the very likely possibility that a relationship between the two of them would not be accepted by most in Sparta.

Other storylines include Sweet's quest to discover the truth about the murder of his grandfather in 1948 and those responsible for it (a story loosely based on the murder of Medgar Evers, "Sweet, Sweet Blues") and racists sabotaging a celebration honoring a Sparta civil rights pioneer in "Odessa", the first of six scripts that Denise Nicholas wrote. She enjoyed her role as Harriet, but was bothered about the lack of black writers on the show.  She complained to Carroll O'Connor about it, and he had to admit she was right.  He asked her to write a script, which she did. When she submitted it to him, he liked it so much that he encouraged her to write others for the series.

In the two-part season finale "Sanctuary" and "The Law on Trial", Sheriff McComb has Gillespie and Tibbs brought up on obstruction charges and harboring a fugitive after an escaped prisoner, who is an El Salvadoran immigrant seeking asylum, is given sanctuary in a monastery and the two don't arrest him when he refuses to give himself up. The prisoner is later shot to death in a standoff with the sheriff's department. Father DiMarco's heartfelt summation to the jury contributes to the case being dismissed (though that is not revealed until the start of Season 6). In between court appearances, Harriet pays Gillespie an inconspicuous visit and the two share a tender and romantic moment.

The conflict between Sheriff McComb and Chief Gillespie lingers on throughout the following season, and that conflict affects every crossover dealing with subsequent interactions between McComb's deputies and Gillespie's officers. It isn't until the arrival of Chief Hampton Forbes (Carl Weathers) in Season 7 that we see Sheriff McComb and Chief Gillespie as friends again.

The episode and the season end with both Gillespie and Tibbs awaiting the verdict in their respective residences the evening the case is given to the jury. At the end of the original and final broadcast on NBC, it was revealed that the jury couldn't reach a verdict, a mistrial is declared and the two men are freed. Bill and Harriet spend the night together for the first time.

Sixth season, 1992–93
At the beginning of Season 6, In the Heat of the Night moved from NBC to CBS. It was not publicly known at the time when Season 5 ended whether or not the show would continue. NBC had decided not to renew the series, although the ratings were still respectable and there were still some open-ended plots that hadn't been resolved. A deal was made with rival network CBS to keep the show on the air. Originally, CBS opted to pick up the series for only a set of six two-hour movies. However, it was eventually picked up for a full 22-episode order.

The first two episodes of the season see the secret romance between Gillespie and DeLong intensify. They frequently meet in a studio apartment that doubles as Harriet's art studio. In the midst of all this, Harriet's son Eugene is a witness to a drive-by shooting involving rival drug gangs.

Other highlights from the season include a faded country music singer (Robert Goulet) who ends up committing murder; the reconciliation between Gillespie and his estranged daughter Lana; and a two-part episode directed by Larry Hagman involves a white supremacist politician whose visit to Sparta has a couple of ulterior motives, including aspirations for a presidential run ("The Leftover Man"). Burgess Meredith (in one of his last acting roles) also appears as an eccentric judge overseeing a case (he would return for a brief cameo in Season 7.)

The season ends with Bill and Harriet forced to confront the impending execution of Harriet's ex-husband and Eugene's disapproval of their relationship.

Howard Rollins' firing
Rollins was dropped from the show due to health reasons plus three outstanding warrants in Rockdale County and the city of Covington, GA. He was replaced for season seven by Carl Weathers. Filming began on April 28, 1993. Rollins had not been seen on the set since January 1993, when season six wrapped. Despite numerous attempts by the media to contact Rollins, who was believed to be living in New York City, only series star Carroll O'Connor was in contact with Rollins during this period. It was hoped that Rollins would get his legal and personal issues resolved and return to the series — but unfortunately, that was not the case.

After season 6, Anne-Marie Johnson and Geoffrey Thorne left the series alongside Rollins. Rollins would return occasionally as a guest star, while Johnson took a starring role on the final season of Fox's sketch comedy series In Living Color.

Thorne left to pursue a career as a novelist and screenwriter; his character simply vanished from the series without any explanation.

Seventh season, 1993–94
Season 7 opens with Bill Gillespie being forced out of office and former Memphis, Tennessee Police Department Inspector Hampton Forbes (Carl Weathers) is hired as the new police chief by the city council. After nearly three decades on the Sparta police force, Gillespie does not receive a new contract from the council because his romance with Harriet is now out in the open, although other excuses are made for his dismissal. He seems to be accepting of the outcome, while Harriet doesn't hesitate to show her fury over the decision. The transition from Gillespie being in charge to Forbes taking over is slightly uneasy at the very start, but soon things smooth out.

However, Gillespie is soon appointed as the acting Sheriff of Newton County when Nathan McComb suffers a heart attack and is too ill to continue his duties. This new appointment for Gillespie angers several on the city council. They want an investigation, which is upsetting and hurtful for Harriet.

Other cases involve a nine-year-old girl being killed because of a drunk driver (Hagman directed), the return of Parker's stepfather, Roy Eversole (Pat Hingle, first seen in Season 6) and his lady friend Miss Roda (Anne Meara). Gillespie must once again confront his racist past when a new synagogue moves into Sparta and the rabbi (Jerry Stiller) detests Gillespie, who in the 1960s was serving as an officer on the Sparta Police, for his failure to oppose the then serving anti-Semitic Sparta police chief, who was then Gillespie's boss, and who refused to investigate the burning of the local synagogue back in the 1960s. Lana Farren also makes one final appearance as Bill's daughter in the Hagman-directed episode "A Love Lost", in which he must protect her from a former boyfriend who is involved in a gun-running scheme with someone in Sparta.

Virgil Tibbs returns from Jackson with his juris doctor — which explains his absence – in his new capacity as attorney in three episodes ("Virgil Tibbs: Attorney At Law", "Good Cop, Bad Cop", "Conspiracy of One") and assists the Sparta P.D. with several cases after having moved into Ben Taylor's law office. Virgil reveals to Gillespie in "Virgil Tibbs: Attorney At Law" that Althea has left him and took their twins back home to Philadelphia to live, fed up with her life in Sparta and traumatized from all that had happened to her while living there.  She didn't want to make the marriage work and later files for divorce, which a heartbroken Virgil does not contest, although he has difficulty accepting his new status as a divorced man. The episode "Conspiracy of One", where Virgil suspects that one of his law firm's clients orchestrated an "accident" which resulted in his spouse's death, marks Howard Rollins' final appearance on the show (air date February 2, 1994).

In the episode "Ches and the Grand Lady", Bobby Short reprises his role as Ches Collins, the blues musician from "Sweet, Sweet Blues" in Season 5. The episode also guest stars Jean Simmons as the dying grand dame of Sparta who also happens to be Ches's old flame and the overbearing great-aunt of Lonnie Jamison. Harriet's son Eugene once again finds himself at odds with the police, endangering his parole trying to help a friend. Maybelle Chesboro (played by Elizabeth Ashley), the ex-madam, returns. (The role of Maybelle was initially played by Diane Ladd in Season 3's "Home Is Where The Heart Is".)  She has returned to operate a legal phone sex business.

Finally, in "Dangerous Engagement", Gillespie and DeLong tie the knot at the same sanctuary involved in the "Sanctuary" case from Season 5. Chief Forbes serves as best man.

The season and the TV series wraps up with a two-hour movie of the week, "Give Me Your Life", starring Peter Fonda as Marcantony Appfel, leader of a religious cult in which the sexual abuse of children is rumored to have occurred. The story (by O'Connor and written by Cynthia Deming & William J. Royce) is loosely based on the real-life drama in Waco, Texas, in 1993 with the cult leader David Koresh and his followers.

TV movies and Hugh O'Connor's death
Four made-for-television movies were produced during the 1994–95 season, which was supposedly the continuation of the series. Once released on DVD, these combined movies were considered the eighth season of the show. The movies were:
 A Matter of Justice
 Who Is Geli Bendl? (directed by Larry Hagman)
 By Duty Bound
 Grow Old Along with Me

Carroll's son and series cast member Hugh O'Connor died by suicide nearly two months before the fourth film aired.  He had been struggling with a substance abuse issue since his teen years which culminated in his demise. When the film was broadcast in its original, two-hour format, a black screen was added in between the intro tag and the opening title; it read "In memory of Hugh O'Connor: 1962–1995".

Writing staff
 Carroll O'Connor (1989–95) as Matt Harris
 Mark Rodgers (1989–90)
 David Moessinger (1988–89)
 Jeri Taylor (1988–89) 
 Edward Deblasio (1989–90)
 Nancy Bond (1988–90)
 William J Royce (1989–94)
 Cynthia Deming (1990–94)
 Robert Bielak (1990–91)
 Mitch Schneider (1990–94)
 Joe Gannon (1991–94) 
 Denise Nicholas (1992–95)
 Terri Erwin (1989–91) 
 Bill Taub (1991)

Cast and characters

Main

Recurring

Guest stars
During the series' 7-season run, many familiar, unfamiliar, and longtime character actors and actresses have made guest appearances, and others were newcomers who went on to become well-known. Some of those appearing in In the Heat of the Night episodes were: 

 Claude Akins 
 Ed Ames 
 Mitchell Anderson 
 Alan Arbus
 Elizabeth Ashley
 Dana Barron
 Jennifer Bassey
 Michael Beck
 Jason Beghe
 Vanessa Bell Calloway
 Paul Benjamin
 James Best
 Taurean Blacque
 Larry Black
 Susan Blakely 
 Wayne Brady
 Randy Brooks
 Tony Burton
 Thomas Jefferson Byrd
 Martha Byrne
 John Davis Chandler
 Byron Cherry
 Kevin Conway 
 Franklin Cover 
 Maury Covington
 Nicolas Cowan
 Gary Crosby
 Ken Curtis 
 John Diehl 
 Art Evans
 Frances Fisher 
 Louise Fletcher
 Peter Fonda 
 Jeffrey Buckner Ford
 Don Galloway
 Willie Gault
 Marla Gibbs
 Thomas Ian Griffith
 Walton Goggins
 Robert Goulet
 J.D. Hall
 Mariska Hargitay
 *Kim Hawthorne 
 Tiger Haynes
 Tippi Hedren
 Earl Holliman 
 Michael Horton
 Iman
 Adrienne-Joi Johnson
 Laura Johnson
 Mickey Jones
 Renée Jones
 Stacy Keach
 Ken Kercheval
 Bruce Kirby
 Diane Ladd 
 Ted Lange
 Mitchell Laurance 
 Kenny Leon
 Ketty Lester
 Geoffrey Lewis 
 Josh Lucas (as Joshua Lucas)
 Marc Macaulay
 Ted Manson
 Ken Marshall
 Rod Masterson 
 Whitman Mayo
 Richard McKenzie
 Bill McKinney 
 Stephen Nichols
 Gail O'Grady
 Lisa Pelikan
 Eric Pierpoint 
 Clifton Powell 
 Francesco Quinn
 Logan Ramsey
 Lisa Rieffel 
 Mark Rolston 
 Stephen Root
 William Sadler
 George C. Scott
 Joe Seneca
 Craig Shoemaker
 Bobby Short
 Sonny Shroyer
 Jean Simmons
 Michael Spound
 Marco St. John
 Stella Stevens
 Mel Stewart 
 Jerry Stiller
 Barbara Stock
 Meshach Taylor
 Christopher Templeton 
 Ernest Lee Thomas
 Melvin Van Peebles 
 Jordan Vaughn 
 Nana Visitor 
 Lou Walker
 Michael Warren 
 Darnell Williams
 Gary Anthony Williams
 Traci Wolfe

Future Dr. Quinn, Medicine Woman stars, Helene Udy, William Shockley and Chad Allen made guest appearances. Future Desperate Housewives star Doug Savant and veteran actor Kevin McCarthy also made their guest appearances on the two-part pilot episode, as well as O. J. Simpson (whom NBC executives originally wanted for the role of Virgil Tibbs, but O'Connor selected Rollins), who made a cameo appearance in Season 2. William Schallert, who played Mayor Schubert in the original 1967 film, also made an appearance on the show in Season 4.

Broadcast history
The series debuted as a midseason replacement for the short-lived NBC series J.J. Starbuck, premiering on March 6, 1988. The series ran on the network until May 19, 1992, then was shown on CBS until its finale after an eighth season, on May 16, 1995.

Locations
Like the original movie, the television series also took place in a fictionalized version of Sparta, Mississippi. While there is a real Sparta, the version of Sparta shown on television is very different from the real town. For example, the TV Sparta is situated along Interstate 20, while the real town is nowhere near any interstate. During the first season, Hammond, Louisiana was the site of the show's production. In the second season, the show was moved to Georgia, to an area east of Atlanta and it remained there for the rest of its run. The principal area of Sparta was in fact downtown Covington, Georgia. Rural scenes were filmed in a wide surrounding area, in the Georgia counties of Newton (where Covington is located), Rockdale, Walton, Morgan, and Jasper. Decatur in Dekalb County was used as a stand-in for an episode as the Mississippi Capital city of Jackson, and Atlanta itself was used in one episode, in which Bubba worked on a case there. In fact, during the series' run, many of the cast members had homes in the area and were often spotted in local restaurants and retail stores. The cast members would also go around to local schools to speak to students.

Broadcast and syndication
The series also airs in broadcast syndication on Ovation. Ovation airs the show every Monday and Tuesday afternoon for five hours from 2:00 PM ET to 7:00 PM ET back to back. WGN America previously aired the series every weekday morning starting at 11AM ET for 4 hours usually until 3PM ET Monday through Thursday. WGN aired the show Fridays, too, at the same time. Ovation now has moved the show to Mondays mornings from 8 AM to 2 PM as part of their "Morning Mysteries" crime and mystery drama block, and Thursdays at 10 PM/9 PM ET/CT (or sometimes 11 PM/10 PM ET/CT.). The show also aired Tuesdays nights at 7PM ET, but was scaled down to just a Thursday airing starting December 7, 2020. MeTV also acquired the rights to the show and it began airing in around either 2018 or 2019, running it every weekday beginning at 11AM ET/10AM CT. MGM's ThisTV network, a classic movie-focused network, also airs the show weekdays. The show previously aired on TNT from 1995 to 2005. The show has remained relatively strong in syndication to this day, particularly airing on some local stations. Bounce TV began airing reruns of the series starting September 13, 2021.

Home media
TGG Direct released the first season on DVD in Region 1 on August 30, 2012. The eighth and final season was released on June 11, 2013.

On October 23, 2012, TGG Direct released an 8-disc best-of set entitled  In the Heat of the Night – 24hr Television Marathon.

TGG Direct released seasons 4 and 5 onto DVD on December 10, 2013. However, due to licensing issues, the following episodes are missing from the box set: Brotherly Love, Shine On Sparta Moon, Sweet, Sweet Blues, Sanctuary, Law On Trial.

TGG Direct released seasons 2 & 3 in a single boxed set onto DVD on March 11, 2014. However, due to clearance issues, the following episodes are excluded –
Season 2 Excluded Episodes: The Family Secret, The Hammer and the Glove, A Trip Upstate, Intruders, Sister Sister, Walkout;
Season 3 Excluded Episodes: Fairest of Them All, Crackdown, Anniversary, My Name is Hank, King's Ransom, A Loss of Innocence, Home is Where the Heart Is, Indiscretions, Citizen Trundel Part 1 and Part 2

TGG Direct also released seasons 6 and 7 in individual boxed sets onto DVD on March 11, 2014. However, due to clearance issues, the following episode is excluded from Season 6: Random's Child and the following episodes are excluded from Season 7: Singin' The Blues, Every Man's Family, Maybelle Returns, Ches and the Grand Lady, Dangerous Engagement.

Awards
Both Carroll O'Connor and Howard Rollins received prestigious awards for their work on the show in 1989. O'Connor received the Primetime Emmy Award for Outstanding Lead Actor in a Drama Series, and Rollins the NAACP Image Award for Outstanding Actor in a Drama Series, his second.

In the Heat of the Night won the NAACP Image Award for Outstanding Drama Series (formally Outstanding Drama Series, Mini-Series or Television Movie), two years in a row, 1992 and 1993. The 1992 win was specifically for the Season 5 episode, "Sweet, Sweet Blues".

Soundtrack
The theme song, "In the Heat of the Night," was originally recorded by Quincy Jones, with Ray Charles on vocals and piano for the movie. It is usually paired with "They Call Me Mr. Tibbs" on albums. Bill Champlin of the band Chicago sang the opening theme song for the television series.

The original song itself is supposed to be from Virgil's point of view, being in a stranger in a hostile environment. In the case of the TV series, the lyrics refer to both main characters fighting crime in the tiny town of Sparta.

Randall Franks and Alan Autry co-produced the cast CD Christmas Time's A Comin' for Sonlite and MGM/UA, featuring the entire cast and a host of music stars. It was released Christmas 1991 and 1992, and was among the top holiday recordings of those years around the South and Midwest.

References

External links
 
 
 Crystal Reel Award

1988 American television series debuts
1994 American television series endings
1980s American crime drama television series
1990s American crime drama television series
1980s American police procedural television series
1990s American police procedural television series
CBS original programming
English-language television shows
NBC original programming
Live action television shows based on films
Television series based on adaptations
American television series revived after cancellation
Television series by MGM Television
Television shows set in Mississippi
Virgil Tibbs